Maha Sila Viravong was a Lao scholar of traditional Lao literature, history, and culture. 

In the 1930s, backed by the Buddhist Institute in Vientiane and the Buddhist Academic Council, he added an additional set of characters to the Lao script, in order to support Pali and Sanskrit, thereby filling the missing gaps in the existing script. While the Buddhist Institute published books that utilised these extended Indic characters, they did not see widespread usage, and fell out of usage by 1975. In 2019, the extended Indic characters were added to Unicode 12. He designed the current Flag of Laos in 1945.

Personal life
Three of his children, Pakian Viravong, Douangdeuane Bounyavong, and Dara Viravong are prominent Laotian writers.

References 

People from Roi Et province
1905 births
1987 deaths
Laotian writers
Laotian culture